City National Bank can refer to:

Banks
City National Bank (California), a bank headquartered in Los Angeles
City National Bank (New Jersey), a former bank headquartered in Newark, closed in 2019
City National Bank of Florida, a bank headquartered in Miami
City National Bank (West Virginia), a bank headquartered in Charleston, West Virginia
City National Bank, a former bank headquartered in Evansville, Indiana, rebranded Integra Bank in 2000
City National Bank and Trust Company, a former bank headquartered in Gloversville, New York, acquired by NBT Bank in 2006
Bank One Corporation, originally chartered as City National Bank of Ohio

Buildings
City National Bank (Tuscaloosa, Alabama), designed by William Leslie Welton
City National Bank (Galveston, Texas), which has also housed Moody National Bank and the Galveston County Historical Museum
City National Bank Building, Mason City, Iowa, part of the Park Inn Hotel complex designed by Frank Lloyd Wright
City National Bank Building (Houston), designed by Alfred C. Finn
City National Bank Building (Miami, Florida)
City National Bank Building (Omaha), also known as the Orpheum Tower
City National Bank Tower, part of the City National Plaza in Los Angeles